Brazil is the country with the largest number of embassies of Latin America. It has diplomatic representation with almost all the recognized states of the world, with the exception of 56 of the 194 countries, being some of them Afghanistan, Bhutan, Cambodia, Fiji, Kiribati, Iceland, Marshall Islands, Micronesia, Monaco, Nauru, Palau, Samoa, San Marino, Solomon Islands, South Sudan, Taiwan, Tuvalu and Yemen, totalizing a relation with 138 countries in all of the continents and with the Palestinian National Authority. Currently, Brazil has strength its relations with the BRICS (Russia, India, China and South Africa) and the next eleven countries under development.

Current Brazilian Ambassadors

Ambassadors to international organizations

References

External links
 Websites of Brazilian Embassies and Consulates (in Portuguese)

 
Brazil
Foreign relations of Brazil